Didier Courrèges (born 15 June 1960 in Évreux, Eure) is a high-level horse rider. He is professor of equitation at the National School of Equitation in Saumur, France, and a member of its equestrian display team, the Cadre Noir.

He is a non-commissioned officer in the French Army and holds the rank of major. He was a member of the French team that won a gold medal in team eventing in the 2004 Summer Olympics.

Honours 
 Knight of the Legion of Honour

References

1960 births
Living people
Sportspeople from Évreux
Event riders
French male equestrians
Olympic equestrians of France
Equestrians at the 2004 Summer Olympics
Olympic medalists in equestrian
Medalists at the 2004 Summer Olympics
Olympic gold medalists for France
21st-century French people